Rohit Gurunath Sharma (born 30 April 1987), is an Indian international cricketer and the current captain of India men’s cricket team in all formats. Considered as one of the best batsman of his generation and one of greatest opening batters of all time, Rohit is known for his timing, elegance, six-hiting abilities and leadership skills. He plays as a right-handed batsman for India national cricket team in international cricket, Mumbai Indians in IPL and for Mumbai in domestic cricket. Rohit also captains Mumbai Indians and the team has won 5 titles under his leadership, the most by any team.

Sharma currently holds the world record for the highest individual score (264) in a One Day International (ODI) match and is the only player to have scored three double-centuries in ODIs and also holds the record for scoring most hundreds (five) in a single Cricket World Cup, for which he won the ICC Men's ODI Cricketer of the Year award in 2019. Sharma has received two national honours, the Arjuna Award in 2015 and the prestigious Major Dhyan Chand Khel Ratna in 2020.

Outside cricket, Sharma is an active supporter of animal welfare campaigns. He is the official Rhino Ambassador for WWF-India and is a member of People for the Ethical Treatment of Animals (PETA). He has worked with PETA in its campaign to raise awareness of the plight of homeless cats and dogs in India.

Early life 
Sharma was born on 30 April 1987 in Bansod, Nagpur, Maharashtra. His mother, Purnima Sharma, is from Visakhapatnam, Andhra Pradesh. His father, Gurunath Sharma, worked as a caretaker of a transport firm storehouse. Sharma was raised by his grandparents and uncles in Borivali because of his father's low income. He would visit his parents, who lived in a single-room house in Dombivli, only during weekends. He has a younger brother, Vishal Sharma.

Sharma joined a cricket camp in 1999 with his uncle's money. Dinesh Lad, his coach at the camp, asked him to change his school to Swami Vivekanand International School, where Lad was the coach and the cricket facilities were better than those at Sharma’s old school. Sharma recollects, "I told him I couldn't afford it, but he got me a scholarship. So for four years I didn't pay a penny, and did well in my cricket". Sharma started as an off-spinner who could bat a bit before Lad noticed his batting ability and promoted him from number eight to open the innings. He excelled in the Harris and Giles Shield school cricket tournaments, scoring a century on debut as an opener.

Youth and domestic first-class career 
Sharma made his List A debut for West Zone against Central Zone in the Deodhar Trophy at Gwalior in March 2005. Batting at number eight, he scored 31 not out as West Zone won by 3 wickets with 24 balls remaining. Cheteshwar Pujara and Ravindra Jadeja made their debuts in the same match. It was Sharma's unbeaten innings of 142 in 123 balls against North Zone at the Maharanna Bhupal College Ground in Udaipur in the same tournament that brought him into the limelight. He visited Abu Dhabi and Australia with the India A squad and was then included among India's 30-member probables list for the upcoming ICC Champions Trophy tournament, although he did not make the final squad.

Sharma made his first-class debut for India A against New Zealand A at Darwin in July 2006. He scored 57 and 22 as India won by 3 wickets. He made his Ranji Trophy debut for Mumbai in the 2006–07 season and scored 205 off 267 balls against Gujarat. Mumbai went on to win the tournament with Sharma scoring a half-century (57) in his second innings in the final against Bengal.

Sharma has spent his entire domestic first-class career at Mumbai. In December 2009, he made his highest career score of 309 not out in the Ranji Trophy against Gujarat. In October 2013, upon the retirement of Ajit Agarkar, he was appointed team captain ahead of the 2013–14 season.

International career

Test matches 
In November 2013, during Sachin Tendulkar's farewell series, Sharma made his Test debut at Eden Gardens in Kolkata against West Indies and scored 177, the second-highest score on debut by an Indian to Shikhar Dhawan (187). He followed it up with 111 (not out) in the second Test at his home ground, the Wankhede Stadium in Mumbai.

Having been out of the Test team since 2017–18, Sharma went on the 2018–19 tour of Australia after he had earned a recall earlier. Chief selector M. S. K. Prasad said the reason for his recall was that his natural game suited the bouncy Australian pitches. Sharma played in the first Test in Adelaide, scoring 37 and 1 in an Indian victory. During the first Test, he sustained a minor injury which saw him miss the second Test in Perth. He recovered for the Boxing Day third Test at Melbourne and scored 63 (not out) to help India total 443/7 and win both the Test and the series. After the third Test, Sharma had to return to India for the birth of his daughter.

In October 2019, in the third Test against South Africa, Sharma scored his 2,000th run and his first double century in Tests. He made 212 in the first innings of the match. Sharma was named as vice-captain of India's Test team during the tour of Australia in 2020, replacing Cheteshwar Pujara.

Sharma had a successful home series against England in 2021. Instrumental in his team's comeback after a defeat in the first Test at Chennai, he scored a century, one that The Guardian termed "deserves to be considered one of the greatest this century." He put on 167 runs with Ajinkya Rahane for the fourth wicket while making 161 runs in an innings that included 18 fours and two sixes. India went on to win the Test by 317 runs. He top-scored for his side in both innings of the low-scoring third Test in Ahmedabad with scores of 66 and 25 contributing to his team's win. Sharma finished the series aggregating 345 runs, the most for India, at an average of 58. He went on to score his first overseas Test century on 4 September 2021 with an innings of 127 against England at The Oval, also reaching the milestone of 3,000 runs in Test cricket.

Sharma was appointed captain of India's Test team in February 2022, succeeding Virat Kohli, ahead of a two-match series against Sri Lanka. Sunil Gavaskar praised his leadership and Chetan Sharma, India's chairman of selectors, said: "We will groom future captains under him".

2015 and 2019 Cricket World Cups 

In March 2015, Sharma made his first appearance in the Cricket World Cup and played in eight matches for India in the 2015 tournament in Australia. India reached the semi-final stage where they were defeated by Australia. Sharma scored 330 runs in the tournament with one century, a score of 137 in the quarter-final against Bangladesh.

On 15 April 2019, Sharma was appointed vice-captain of India's squad for the 2019 World Cup in England. In the opening match against South Africa, he scored 122, including his 12,000th run in international cricket. He followed it up with centuries against Pakistan, England and Bangladesh. In the match against Sri Lanka, hitting yet another century, he became the first batsman to score five centuries in a single World Cup tournament, and equalled Tendulkar's record for the most centuries (6) in all World Cup matches. Sharma totalled 648 runs in the tournament to finish as the leading run-scorer and win the ICC's Golden Bat award, the third Indian player to do so.

Other one-day international matches 
Sharma made his full international debut in a one-day match against Ireland in Belfast on 23 June 2007. This was part of the 2007 Future Cup competition which also involved South Africa. He was number seven in the batting order but did not bat as India won the game by 9 wickets.

He scored his maiden ODI half-century (52) against Pakistan at Jaipur on 18 November 2007 and was selected for the Indian squad going to the 2007–08 Commonwealth Bank Series in Australia. In that series, he scored 235 runs at an average of 33.57 with 2 fifties, including 66 in the first final at Sydney when he partnered Sachin Tendulkar for most of India's successful run chase. After that, however, his ODI performances suffered a downturn and he lost his middle-order position to Suresh Raina. Later, Virat Kohli took his position as the reserve batsman. In December 2009, following his triple century in the Ranji Trophy, he was recalled to the ODI team for the tri-nations tournament in Bangladesh as Tendulkar opted to rest in the series.

He scored his maiden ODI century (114) against Zimbabwe on 28 May 2010 and followed it up with another century in the next match of the tri-series against Sri Lanka on 30 May 2010 by scoring 101 not out. He had a run of poor form in South Africa just before the 2011 World Cup and as a consequence he was left out of India's squad for the tournament.

Sharma was recalled to the limited-overs squad for the tour of the West Indies in June and July 2011. In the first match at Queen's Park Oval, he scored 68 (not out) from 75 balls with three fours and a six. In the third match at the Sir Vivian Richards Stadium in Antigua, he scored a match-winning 86 off 91 balls after India had been reduced to 92 for 6.

He had a disastrous loss of form in 2012 and scored only 168 runs in the whole calendar year at the very low average of 12.92 with just a single half-century. Even so, his captain Mahendra Singh Dhoni showed faith in him, and his career was revived in 2013. Dhoni decided to move him up the batting order to open the innings with Shikhar Dhawan in the 2013 ICC Champions Trophy. The pairing was a success and India won the competition, defeating hosts England in the final.

His good form continued and, later in the year against Australia, he scored 141 (not out) in Jaipur. He followed that with 209 off 158 balls in Bangalore and established a then-world record for the most sixes (16) in a one-day international innings (since beaten by Eoin Morgan of England with 17). On 13 November 2014, playing against Sri Lanka at Eden Gardens in Kolkata, Sharma broke the world record for the highest score in a one-day international innings with 264 from 173 deliveries.

In December 2017, India's captain Virat Kohli was rested for the series against Sri Lanka, in preparation for India's tour to South Africa, which began in the first week of January 2018. In his place, Sharma was appointed team captain and India under his leadership won the series 2–1, their eighth consecutive series win since defeating Zimbabwe in June 2016. Sharma also hit his third ODI double-century in this series, scoring 208 (not out) to extend his record of most ODI double-centuries by a player.

In September 2018, in the absence of many top players including regular captain Virat Kohli, Sharma led India to win the 2018 Asia Cup, where they defeated Bangladesh in the final.

On 12 January 2019, in the opening match against Australia at the Sydney Cricket Ground, Sharma scored 133 but it was in vain as India lost by 34 runs. It was his 22nd century in one-day internationals. At Delhi on 13 March 2019, in the fifth and final match of a home series against Australia, Sharma scored 56 including his 8,000th run in one-day internationals. It was his 200th innings. In 2019, he scored the most runs in ODIs by any batsman, with 1,490 runs in the calendar year, including 7 centuries.

In November 2020, Sharma was nominated for the ICC Men's ODI Cricketer of the Decade award.

In July 2022, Sharma became the first Indian captain to lead their team to both T20I and ODI series wins in England. He became the 3rd Indian captain to win an ODI series in England, and the first since 2014.

Twenty20 international matches 

Sharma was included in the Indian squad for the 2007 ICC World Twenty20 and made his mark by scoring an unbeaten 50 from 40 deliveries against hosts South Africa in the quarter-finals. This enabled India to win the match by 37 runs and they went on to defeat Pakistan in the final, when Sharma scored 30 (not out) from 16 deliveries.

On 2 October 2015, during the South African tour of India, Sharma scored 106 in the first Twenty20 international at HPCA Stadium in Dharamshala. With that, he became the second Indian cricketer to have scored centuries in all three formats of international cricket.

In December 2017, in a series against Sri Lanka, Sharma scored the joint-fastest T20I century, in 35 balls, ending with 118 from 43 deliveries, equaling the record of David Miller. This was also his second century in Twenty20 internationals.

On 8 July 2018, during a series in England, Sharma became the second Indian batsman, after Virat Kohli, to score 2,000 runs in a Twenty20 international career. He was the fifth batsman worldwide to achieve the feat; the others besides Kohli were Brendon McCullum, Martin Guptill and Shoaib Malik. He also scored his third T20I century during this series, equaling the then-record for most T20I centuries, held by Colin Munro.

In March 2018, he led Team India to win the Nidahas Trophy under his captaincy. In November 2018, in a series against West Indies, he scored his fourth T20I century, creating a new record for the most centuries by a player in T20I cricket. 

In November 2019, in the opening match of the series against Bangladesh, Sharma became the most-capped cricketer for India in T20Is, playing in his 99th match. In the next match of the series, he became the first male cricketer for India to play in 100 T20Is.

In November 2020, Sharma was nominated for the ICC Men's T20I Cricketer of the Decade award.

In July 2022, Sharma became the first captain in T20I history to lead their team to 14 consecutive victories.

With his participation in the 2022 T20 World Cup in Australia, Sharma became the only Indian cricketer to have played in every edition of the tournament since its inception in 2007.

On 27 October 2022, Sharma broke the record for most sixes by an Indian batsman in T20 World Cups, previously held by Yuvraj Singh, hitting his 34th six against Netherlands at Sydney Cricket Ground.

Indian Premier League 
Sharma joined the Indian Premier League (IPL) in 2008 when he was signed by the Deccan Chargers franchise, based in Hyderabad, for the sum of US$750,000 a year. In the 2011 auction, he was sold for US$2 million to the Mumbai Indians. He scored his only IPL century in the 2012 tournament with 109 (not out) against the Kolkata Knight Riders. Under his leadership, Mumbai has won the IPL in 2013, 2015, 2017, 2019 and 2020; they also won the former Champions League Twenty20 competition in 2013.

Sharma has been one of the most successful players in the IPL as captain since 2013 of the Mumbai Indians, who have won the tournament five times under his leadership. He is currently (March 2022) one of six players who have scored 5,000 career runs in the competition. Sharma has 5,611 runs with one century and 40 half centuries and is the third-highest run scorer after Virat Kohli (6,283) and Shikhar Dhawan (5,784).

Playing style 

Sharma is an aggressive batsman but plays with style and elegance. He is usually an opening batsman in limited overs cricket, but has played most of his Test cricket as a middle-order batsman. In limited overs cricket, Sharma is widely recognised as one of the format's most outstanding batsmen. And for his attacking batting and six hitting abilities he often referred as Hitman.

Sunil Gavaskar considers Sharma to have a batting style similar to those of Virender Sehwag and Viv Richards. In his column for The Times of India in November 2018, Gavaskar said:

While Sharma is not a regular bowler, he can bowl right arm off spin. He usually fields in the slips and has said this is a part of his game which he works very hard on for improvement.

Achievements 

Sharma holds the world record for the highest individual score by a batsman playing in a one-day international match, having scored 264 against Sri Lanka at Eden Gardens, Kolkata, on 13 November 2014. He is the only player to have scored three double-centuries in this form of international cricket. In January 2020, Sharma was named as the ODI Player of the Year by the International Cricket Council (ICC). During the 2019 World Cup, Sharma became the only batsman to scored five centuries in a single edition of the Cricket World Cup.

On 5 October 2019, during a Test match against South Africa, Sharma became the first batsman to score two centuries in a match on his first appearance as an opening batsman. In the same series, he broke Shimron Hetmyer's record for the highest number of sixes in a Test series.

National honours 

 2015 – Arjuna Award
 2020 – Major Dhyan Chand Khel Ratna

Sporting honours 
 ICC Men's ODI Cricketer of the Year: 2019
 ICC Men's ODI Team of the Year: 2014 (12th man), 2016, 2017, 2018, 2019
 ICC Men's ODI Team of the Decade: 2011–2020
 ICC Men's T20I Team of the Decade: 2011–2020
 ICC Men's Test Team of the Year: 2021

For his achievements on India's tour of England in 2021, Sharma was selected by Wisden Cricketers' Almanack as one of the five Wisden Cricketers of the Year in its 2022 edition.

Outside cricket

Personal life 

Sharma married his longtime girlfriend, Ritika Sajdeh on 13 December 2015. They have one child, a girl born on 30 December 2018. He is a practitioner of the meditation technique Sahaj Marg.

He practices an Eggetarian diet  but is known to have eaten beef at least once since.

Commercial endorsements 
Sharma has been sponsored by several brands including CEAT and the Swiss watchmaker Hublot. In his career, Sharma has endorsed many other brands including Maggi, Fair and Lovely, Lay's, Nissan, energy drink Relentless, Nasivion nasal spray, Aristocrat by VIP Industries, Adidas and Oppo mobiles.

Philanthropy 
Sharma engages in numerous philanthropic activities, promoting various causes such as animal welfare, health, and children. He is particularly vocal about the protection of animals and has supported various initiatives and organisations to promote the cause.

In February 2015, Sharma joined People for the Ethical Treatment of Animals (PETA) to support sterilisation of homeless cats and dogs. When supporting the cause Sharma said, "Sterilisation is important because I feel that if we can stop (the homeless-animal crisis), there will be control of population among the street dogs".

In September 2015, along with Hollywood actors Matt LeBlanc and Salma Hayek, Sharma joined an anti-poaching campaign in Kenya to save the wild animals of Africa including the last surviving northern white rhinoceros. When joining the campaign Sharma said, "I have been a member of PETA and when I was informed about the cause, I thought it is my duty to join the anti-poaching drive. That's what got me to Nairobi. I was fascinated to have a look at Sudan (the last northern white rhino) and the sniffer dogs who catch hold of the poachers".

In November 2017, Sharma in a video on social media said that he had agreed with an online store to merchandise mobile phone covers and other items that would use his name and ODI jersey no. 45. Sharma also told his Twitter followers: "All proceeds from your purchases would go to an animal charity of my choice".

In 2018 on "World Rhino Day", Sharma was announced as the WWF-India Rhino Ambassador. Ravi Singh, the CEO and Secretary General of WWF-India, said "We welcome Rohit into the WWF family". After taking a pledge for the cause of rhino conservation, Sharma said, "My love for rhinos sparked when I first heard about Sudan, the last male northern white African rhino who passed away this year thus leading to the inevitable extinction of the entire species and that broke my heart. As the world and I mourned for my fallen friend Sudan, I researched the best way for me to help prevent something like this happening and the best way I know how is to create awareness. After getting in touch with WWF I learnt that 82% of the world’s rhinos reside in India and I am honoured to be WWF-India’s rhino ambassador to spread awareness and do my bit to contribute to the protection and survival of the rhino and help make this world a better place for them."

References

External links 

 Rohit Sharma biography
 
 Rohit Sharma at Wisden

1987 births
Living people
Cricketers at the 2015 Cricket World Cup
Cricketers at the 2019 Cricket World Cup
Cricketers from Mumbai
Cricketers from Nagpur
Cricketers who made a century on Test debut
Deccan Chargers cricketers
India Green cricketers
India One Day International cricketers
India Red cricketers
India Test cricketers
India Twenty20 International cricketers
Indian Hindus
Indian cricketers
Indian philanthropists
Marathi people
Mumbai Indians cricketers
Mumbai cricketers
Recipients of the Arjuna Award
Recipients of the Khel Ratna Award
Telugu people
West Zone cricketers
Wisden Cricketers of the Year
World Wide Fund for Nature